Agasadi  is a village in the southern state of Karnataka, India. It is located in the Tirthahalli taluk of Shimoga district in Karnataka.

See also
 Shimoga
 Mangalore
 Districts of Karnataka

References

External links
 http://Shimoga.nic.in/

Villages in Shimoga district